The Malcolm Blight Medal is a post-season award given to the best and fairest player for the Adelaide Football Club. The medal was first awarded in 1991, and later named after former Adelaide Crows coach Malcolm Blight. The voting system as of the 2017 AFL season, consists of five coaches giving each player a ranking from zero to four after each match. Players can receive a maximum of 20 votes for a game.

Recipients

Multiple winners

References
General

 

Specific

Australian Football League awards
Adelaide Football Club
Awards established in 1991
Australian rules football-related lists